Northern Vance High School was a high school in Henderson, North Carolina, USA, located at 293 Warrenton Road. The school's mascot was a Viking and the fight song was the "Notre Dame Victory March".

History 
The school opened as Vance Senior High in 1968, replacing Henderson High School near downtown Henderson. The new school was located approximately four miles north outside the town limits. It was expanded in 1974 adding M and L Suites and a second cafeteria. Most students and faculty affectionately refer to the cafeterias as the "Old" Cafeteria or the "New Cafeteria", although both are connected.

In 1990, the school name was changed to Northern Vance High School, following a split in the student population by the school board in response to a growing population at the time. Southern Vance High School opened the same year, essentially taking half of Vance Senior High School's students.

Later that same year, the new Northern Vance High School befell violence after one student shot another in the halls. The student survived the shooting. The student who committed the crime calmly walked down the hall after the shooting, placing the gun on then Principal Wayne Adcock's desk, sat down and awaited his arrest by Vance County Sheriff's officials. The shooting made regional and national news headlines. The front page of the town's newspaper, The Henderson Daily Dispatch (then published Monday-Saturday in the afternoon), showed the victim being loaded into an ambulance with EMS workers and the school nurse.

In March 2018, Vance County Schools announced that it was consolidating both high school campuses into one location as a cost-cutting measure. The new school, Vance County High School, would be located at the former Southern Vance High campus. Northern Vance later became the site of Vance Middle School, itself a consolidation of two other middle schools in the area.

Notable alumni 
 Jason Brown, former NFL center 
 Carlos Fields, former NFL linebacker

References

External links 
 
 

Schools in Vance County, North Carolina
Public high schools in North Carolina